Washington Avenue Historic District is a national historic district located at Fredericksburg, Virginia. The district includes 36 contributing buildings, 1 contributing site (the Gordon Family Cemetery), and 4 contributing objects in the city of Fredericksburg. It includes substantial, high-style residences that line both the east and the west sides of Washington Avenue reflect the various domestic styles that were popular at the turn of the 20th century.   Notable dwellings include the Samuel W. Somerville House (1896-1897), Shepherd House (1910-1911), and Mary Washington Monument Caretaker's Lodge (1896).  The four commemorative works are the Mary Washington Monument (1893), General Hugh Mercer Monument (1906) by Edward Virginius Valentine (1838-1930), Jefferson Religious Freedom Monument (1932), and the George Rogers Clark Memorial (1929).  Located in the district is the separately listed Kenmore.

It was listed on the National Register of Historic Places in 2002.

References

Houses on the National Register of Historic Places in Virginia
National Register of Historic Places in Fredericksburg, Virginia
Historic districts on the National Register of Historic Places in Virginia
Houses in Fredericksburg, Virginia